Jean-Baptiste-Auguste de Villoutreix de Faye was a French prelate of the Catholic Church. He served as the last Bishop of the Diocese of Oloron in France.

He was born in Flavignac in the Limousin region of France, a member of the Villoutreix de Faye family who derived their name from the Castle "Faye" in the parish of Flavignac (Haute-Vienne).

He was appointed Bishop of Oloron on 18 July 1783, and was consecrated as a bishop on 17 August 1783 by the Archbishop of Toulouse, Étienne Charles de Loménie de Brienne.

A keen scholar, he wrote in Occitan, French and Basque, and his written works include:

He died in Paris.

References

External links 
 

1739 births
1792 deaths
18th-century French Roman Catholic bishops
Bishops of Oloron